Mathilde is a 2004 drama film written and directed by Nina Mimica and starring Jeremy Irons, Nutsa Kukhianidze and Sinéad Cusack. It was a co-production between several countries. The screenplay concerns a young girl who attempts to kill a UN peacekeeper after the war in Croatia.

Plot summary
A young girl attempts to kill a UN peacekeeper after the war in Croatia, leading to an investigation into the circumstances of their first meeting.

Cast
 Jeremy Irons - Col. De Petris 
 Nutsa Kukhianidze - Mathilde 
 Dejan Aćimović - Croat corporal 
 Radko Polič - Unemployed major 
 Ksenija Marinković - Croat captain 
 Lea Gramsdorff - Bella 
 Richard Harrington - Babyface 
 Miki Manojlović - Journalist 
 Sinéad Cusack - Wife of Col. De Petris 
 Svetozar Cvetković - Paragic
 Marko Petrović - Soldier

References

External links

2004 films
Films shot in Montenegro
2004 drama films
2000s English-language films